Platinum Karaoke is a Philippine 3x3 basketball team which competes in the PBA 3x3, organized by the Philippines' top-flight professional league, Philippine Basketball Association.

History
The Platinum Karaoke entered the PBA 3x3 in 2021 as a guest team. It is owned by Vismay International Corporation, a manufacturer of karaoke systems and accessories. With their roster filled with 3x3 veterans, they were considered as the favorites to win the inaugural 2021 PBA 3x3 title. Platinum finished second to the Limitless Appmasters in the first conference of the grand finals.

Platinum participated in the 2022 ABL 3x3 International Champions Cup where it placed third in the men's competition.

Current roster

References

PBA 3x3 teams
2021 establishments in the Philippines
Basketball teams established in 2021